The Gallatin Formation is a geologic formation in Wyoming and Montana. It preserves fossils dating back to the Cambrian period.

See also

 List of fossiliferous stratigraphic units in Wyoming
 Paleontology in Wyoming

References
 
 Cambrian Stratigraphy of Northwestern Wyoming, B. Maxwell Miller, 1936

Cambrian geology of Wyoming
Cambrian southern paleotropical deposits